Tillandsia aeranthos is a species of plant in the genus Tillandsia. This species is native to southern Brazil, Paraguay, Uruguay, and Argentina.

Cultivars 
 Tillandsia 'Bergos'
 Tillandsia 'Bob Whitman'
 Tillandsia 'Cooroy'
 Tillandsia 'Ed Doherty'
 Tillandsia 'Eureka'
 Tillandsia 'Flamingoes'
 Tillandsia 'Kayjay'
 Tillandsia 'Mariposa'
 Tillandsia 'Nez Misso'
 Tillandsia 'Noosa'
 Tillandsia 'Oboe'
 Tillandsia 'Oliver Twist'
 Tillandsia 'Purple Giant'
 Tillandsia 'Tropic Skye'
 Tillandsia 'Veronica's Mariposa'
 Tillandsia 'Winner's Circle'

References 

aeranthos
Flora of South America
Plants described in 1821